My Too Perfect Sons (lit. The Sons of Sol Pharmacy House) is a 2009 South Korean television series starring Son Hyun-joo, Lee Pil-mo, Han Sang-jin, Ji Chang-wook, Park Sun-young, Yoo Sun, Yoo Ha-na, Kang Eun-bi, Byun Hee-bong, Baek Il-seob, Yoon Mi-ra, Kim Yong-gun, Kim Hye-ok, Cho Jin-woong and Choi Ji-na. It aired on KBS2 from April 11 to October 11, 2009 on Saturdays and Sundays at 19:55 for 54 episodes.

Plot
The Song family is headed by patriarch Kwang-ho and spunky mother Ok-hee. They have four sons—Jin-poong, Dae-poong, Sun-poong and Mi-poong. Ok-hee has doted on her four sons all their lives, but has interfered with their relationships when deeming the girlfriends "not good enough" for her perfect sons. Now she despairs that they are growing older and will never marry.

Eldest son Jin-poong is nearing his 40th birthday. He's a pharmacist whose store is in the same neighborhood as his home. His personality is shy and awkward around women, although he's a gentle and caring person. He's never quite gotten over his first love Kim Hye-rim, and feels conflicted when she moves back to her childhood home across the street from the pharmacy, along with her husband Brutus and their two children. Then Jin-poong meets Brutus's younger sister Lee Soo-jin, a smart, tough lawyer.

In contrast to his older brother's cautious and responsible personality, second son Dae-poong is a playboy doctor who gets out of scrapes with his boyish charm. He runs a small clinic right above Jin-poong's pharmacy, with one employee, nurse Kim Bok-shil. Bok-shil doesn't have any family and lives by herself in an apartment in the neighborhood, and comes by to the Song household daily to help their mother cook and clean. Dae-poong takes Bok-shil for granted, not knowing that she's a little bit in love with him.

Third son Sun-poong is a vegetarian and animal-lover who works as a news reporter at broadcast station KBC. He's earnest, sweet, honest, and a little dense when it comes to romance. Sun-poong's direct boss, TV station director Oh Young-dal sets him up with his daughter, newcomer actress Eun-ji. Eun-ji has a spoiled princess complex and she doesn't think Sun-poong is her type, but when he doesn't seem interested in her, her ego takes a blow and his obliviousness makes him attractive to her.

The youngest son is 19-year-old Mi-poong, who just graduated from high school and has failed to be accepted to university, so he's in the middle of studying for a retest. He's extremely sensitive, and speaks to everyone in super-formal language. Gifted in sewing and crafts, Mi-poong often gets mocked for being too girly. Mi-poong's best friend Park Yong-chul got a girl, Choi Soo-hee pregnant, and she leaves her five-month-old baby Hana with him. As Yong-chul works multiple jobs to earn money, Mi-poong looks after Hana and grows attached to the baby. When Yong-chul receives his army papers, Mi-poong agrees to take care of Hana until he gets discharged.

Cast

Song family
Son Hyun-joo as Song Jin-poong, pharmacist
Lee Pil-mo as Song Dae-poong, doctor
Han Sang-jin as Song Sun-poong, TV reporter
Ji Chang-wook as Song Mi-poong, student
Baek Il-seob as Song Kwang-ho, father
Yoon Mi-ra as Bae Ok-hee, mother
Byun Hee-bong as Song Shi-yeol, grandfather

Oh family
Yoo Ha-na as Oh Eun-ji, actress
Kim Yong-gun as Oh Young-dal, father, TV station director
Kim Hye-ok as Ahn Moon-sook, mother

Lee family
Park Sun-young as Lee Soo-jin
Cho Jin-woong as Brutus Lee, Soo-jin's brother
Choi Ji-na as Kim Hye-rim, Brutus's wife
Joo Hye-rin as Lee Ma-ri, Brutus and Hye-rim's daughter
Jung Joon-hwi as Lee Sung-jin, Brutus and Hye-rim's son

Extended cast
 Yoo Sun as Kim Bok-shil/Jennifer Kim, nurse
 Kang Eun-bi as Choi Soo-hee
 Yoon Hee-kyung as Kim Yoo-ra, Dae-poong's girlfriend/Soo-jin's roommate
 Ha Jae-sook as Jo Mi-ran, Ok-hee's niece
 Kim Joo-hwan as Park Yong-chul, Mi-poong's friend
 Kim Ye-rang as Lee Hye-ri, Eun-ji's assistant
 Song Jong-beom as Mr. Jang, Sun-poong's PD
 Bang Eun-jin as Diana Yoon, fashion designer
 Lee Deok-hee as Lee Eun-jung, hairdresser
 Yoon Young-joon as Dr. Park Hyun-woo
 Yoon Joo-sang as Dr. Kim Yoon-jong, hospital director
 Seo Yeon-joo as Dr. Kim Mi-yeon, Yoon-jong's daughter
 Go Jung-min as Jung-hee
 Kim Dong-young as Park Yong-chul, Song Mi-poong's friend.
 Jo Yeon-hee as Child's guardian
 Jeon Hee-sun as Yu-ri
 Kim Jin-woo  as Sun-poong's son
 Sung Chang-hoon as In-bae

Awards and nominations

References

External links
My Too Perfect Sons official KBS website 

2009 South Korean television series debuts
2009 South Korean television series endings
Korean Broadcasting System television dramas
South Korean comedy television series
South Korean romance television series